The 1976 NCAA Division I Tennis Championships were the 31st annual tournaments to determine the national champions of NCAA Division I men's singles, doubles, and team collegiate tennis in the United States. 

USC and UCLA shared the team championship, the twelfth for both the Bruins and the Trojans, after the two teams finished tied atop the final team standings (21–21).

Host site
This year's tournaments were contested at the Orville I. Cox Tennis Center at University of Texas–Pan American (now known as University of Texas–Rio Grande Valley) in Edinburg, Texas, but actually played at the HEB Tennis Center in Corpus Christi, Texas.

Team scoring
Until 1977, the men's team championship was determined by points awarded based on individual performances in the singles and doubles events.

References

External links
List of NCAA Men's Tennis Champions

NCAA Division I tennis championships
NCAA Division I Tennis Championships
NCAA Division I Tennis Championships
NCAA Division I Tennis Championships